"She Left Love All Over Me" is a song written by Chester Lester, and recorded by American country music artist Razzy Bailey.  It was released in December 1981 as the first single from the album Feelin' Alright. The song reached No. 1 on the Billboard magazine Hot Country Singles chart.  The song was Bailey's fifth (and final) No. 1 song in a string that dated back to 1980's "Lovin' Up a Storm"; Bailey's streak includes several double-sided hits where the flip side had its own peak.

Charts

Weekly charts

Year-end charts

References

Roland, Tom, "The Billboard Book of Number One Country Hits." (Billboard Books, Watson-Guptill Publications, New York, 1991)
[ She Left Love All Over Me] at Allmusic.

1982 singles
Razzy Bailey songs
Songs written by Chester Lester
Song recordings produced by Bob Montgomery (songwriter)
RCA Records Nashville singles
1981 songs